Smeringopus pallidus, known as the pale daddy-long-leg, is a species of spider of the genus Smeringopus, family Pholcidae. It is a cosmopolitan species found in many countries.

Description
This species has a body length up to 7 mm, with males being smaller than females. It has a cylindrical and elongate abdomen. The purple spots along the dorsal surface of the abdomen are a characteristic feature. There is a dark stripe on the ventral surface of the sternum. A synanthropic spider, it builds irregular cobwebs in sheltered areas to capture small insects and other spiders for food. The legs lack spines and have a few vertical hairs. The female has a simple epigynum without pockets.

Habitat
Smeringopus pallidus can be found in dusty and dark corners of the house. They also build their webs under covered drains and on mud walls in gardens and the countryside. When disturbed, they hang upside down in the web and vibrate themselves vigorously to confuse the intruder.

See also
 List of Pholcidae species

References

External links
Crossopriza Iyoni and Smeringopus pallidus: cellar spiders new to Florida

Spiders described in 1858
Pholcidae
Cosmopolitan spiders